= April 1991 Civic Democratic Party leadership election =

Czechoslovak political party election

- 21 April 1991
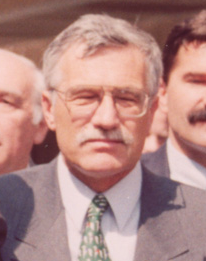
Candidate	Václav Klaus
Electoral vote	220
Percentage	92%
Elected Leader of ODS
Václav Klaus

A leadership election for the Civic Democratic Party (ODS) was held in Czechoslovakia on 21 April 1991. Václav Klaus was elected the first leader of ODS. 247 delegates were allowed to vote. Klaus was the only candidate. He received 220 votes while 19 delegates voted against him.

== Results ==
Candidate	Votes	%
Václav Klaus	220	92.05
Against	19	7.95
Total	239	100
